The Urums, singular Urum (Urúm; Turkish and Crimean Tatar: Urum) are several groups of Turkic-speaking Greek Orthodox people in Crimea and Georgia.

History 
There are two main theories covering how the Urums may have originated. One hypothesis is that the Urums arose as a result of some Crimean Greeks converting to using the Crimean Tatar language. Another theory is that the Urums arose as a result of the adoption of Christianity by a group of Crimean Tatars. A specialist in the history of the Crimean Greeks, M. Arajioni notes: “The narrowing of the scope of the use of the Greek language in the southwestern Crimea and in the cities of Crimea led some of the Crimean “Romans” to the loss of their native language. Thus, Urums are Greeks who have undergone linguistic assimilation, and not "baptized Tatars". Some also speculate that the Urums from Crimea/Ukraine and Georgia have the same origins from Anatolia, with some even going as far to say that the two Urum groups speak the same language; however, the latter is not supported with the available linguistic data.

Etymology
The term Urum is derived from the Arabic word  (rūm), meaning Roman and subsequently Byzantine and Greek, with a prothetic u in some Turkic languages. In Ottoman Turkish under the Ottoman Empire, Rum denoted Orthodox Christians living in the Empire; in modern Turkish, Rum denotes Greeks living in Turkey. The word "Urum" involves a prothetic u- that generally appears in Turkic language loanwords initially starting with a r-. The common use of the term Urum appears to have led to some confusion, as most Turkish-speaking Greeks were called Urum.

The term is used by the following sub-ethnic groups of Greeks as a way of ethnic self-identification:

 Crimean-Tatarophone Greeks of North Azov (Ukraine) (Crimean Greeks)
 Turcophone Greeks of Tsalka (Georgia) (see Caucasus Greeks)

North Azovian Urums 

The Greeks of Crimea (and later of the adjacent Azovian region; present-day Donetsk Oblast, Ukraine) were represented by two groups: the Hellenic-speaking Romaioi, whose dialect is known as Rumeíka, a.k.a. Mariupol Greek, and the Turkic-speaking Urums (also called Graeco-Tatars). These Byzantine Greeks of Crimea are Pontic Greeks who colonised Crimea. Both groups populated the region over the course of many centuries, and consist of both the descendants of the ancient (4th century BC – 4th century AD) Greek and Byzantine Christian Greek colonizers of the northern shores of the Black Sea and interior of southern Russia and Ukraine, and also of Pontic Greeks who fled as refugees, or 'economic migrants,' from northeastern Anatolia between the fall of the Empire of Trebizond to the Ottomans in 1461 and the 1828-29 Russo-Turkish War. However, the Greek settlers of the Crimea region underwent social and cultural processes, which led to them adopting the Crimean Tatar language as a mother tongue.

In 1777, after the annexation of Crimea by the Russian Empire, Empress Catherine the Great ordered all Greeks from the peninsula to settle in the North Azov region around Mariupol, and they have been known as the North Azovian Greeks (приазовские греки priazovskie greki) henceforth. Some linguists believe that the dialect spoken by the North Azovian Urums differs from the common Crimean Tatar language on a more than just dialectical level and therefore constitutes a separate language unit within the Kypchak language sub-group (see Urum language).

Urums practice Eastern Orthodox Christianity. Throughout history, they represented an isolated cultural group and rarely settled in towns populated by the Romaioi, despite sharing Greek heritage with them. Unlike Greek, Urum has never been a language of secondary education in Ukraine. Turkologist Nikolai Baskakov estimated that by 1969, 60,000 people spoke Urum as a native language. According to the All-Ukrainian Population Census of 2001, only 112 of the Donetsk Oblast's 77,516 Greeks listed languages other than Greek, Ukrainian and Russian as their mother tongue.

Tsalka Urums 

Between the fall of the Empire of Trebizond to the Ottomans in 1461 and the Russian annexation of Georgia in 1801 there had been several waves of Pontic Greeks who left the eastern Black Sea coastline and the highlands of the Pontic Alps, and then settled as refugees or economic migrants in Georgia and the South Caucasus. The largest and most recent waves came in the late 18th and especially the early 19th century, when the South Caucasus experienced mass migrations of Greeks from the Ottoman Empire, mainly from the region of Pontus, as well as the vilayets of Sivas and Erzurum in northeastern Anatolia. This wave of Pontic emigrants is particularly associated with the 1828-29 Russo-Turkish War, when many Pontic Greeks collaborated with or welcomed the Russian army that had occupied the region and then, to escape likely Turkish reprisals, followed it with their families when it withdrew back into Russian territory.

Many Pontian Greeks spoke Turkish either as Greek-Turkish bilinguals, or as a mother tongue due to linguistic assimilation processes that isolated groups of the Anatolian Greeks were exposed to.

According to Andrei Popov, throughout the 19th century hundreds of Turkish-speaking Greek Orthodox families from Erzurum, Gümüşhane and Artvin moved to Southern Russia and settled on the Tsalka Plateau, in present-day Georgia. During the Soviet era they populated over 20 villages in Georgia's Tsalka, Dmanisi, Tetritsqaro, Marneuli, and Akhaltsikhe regions. In 1926, there were 24,000 Greeks living in Tiflis and the neighbouring area with 20,000 of them being Turcophone.

The dialect spoken by the Tsalka Urums is similar to that of the Meskhetian-Ahiska Turks, an Eastern Anatolian dialect of Turkish, which hails from the regions of Kars, Ardahan, and Artvin. The Turkish Meskhetian-Ahiska dialect has also borrowed from other languages (including Azerbaijani, Georgian, Kazakh, Kyrgyz, Russian, and Uzbek) which the Meskhetian-Ahiska Turks have been in contact with during the Russian and Soviet rule. However some linguists, like Nikolai Baskakov, classify it as a separate Oghuz language due to differences in phonetics, vocabulary and grammar. Present-day Urum Turkish is also thought by some to be phonetically closer to Azeri than to the literary Turkish, which leads them to believe that it is rather a dialect of Azeri. Late Soviet censuses also showed Azeri as the mother tongue of the Tsalka Urums, however this may have been done simply due to the Soviets' somewhat unfavourable attitude towards Turkish culture. No secondary education in Urum Turkish has been available; its speakers attended schools where subjects were taught in Azeri and later in Russian.

The Tsalka Urums themselves call their language bizim dilja (turk. 'our language') or moussourmanja (turk. 'Muslims' language). Nowadays, the majority speaks Russian. Also starting from the 1960s, there has been a modest cultural revival among the Turcophone Greeks. Historian Airat Aklaev's research showed that 36% of them considered Greek their mother tongue despite not speaking it; 96% expressed a desire to learn Greek.

A documentation project on the language of Caucasus Urum people compiled a basic lexicon, a sample of translations for the study of grammar, and a text collection. The website of the project contains further information about the language and the language community.

After the dissolution of the Soviet Union, serious migration did take place, so Greeks are no longer the largest ethnic group in Tsalka. Between 1989 and 2002, their population declined from 35,000 to 3,000. Many emigrated to Greece, particularly Thessaloniki and other parts of Greek Macedonia in Northern Greece, and also to the relatively near the North Caucasus region of Krasnodar Krai and other parts of Southern Russia (particularly the cities of Krasnodar, Abinsk, Sochi, and Gelendzhik).

Religion 
By religion, the majority of Urums are Greek Orthodox Christians, stemming from their Greek ancestry. Their following of Christianity is a rarity among speakers of Turkic languages. Urums tend to practice their religion in Greek, Georgian or Russian Orthodox churches. Despite there not being any liturgical practices in Urum, 60% (18/30 respondents) of native Urum speakers reported that they use Urum in praying. 23% of Urum vocabulary in the field of religion or belief are said to be loanwords - much less than the average across world languages, being estimated to be 43%. According to legend common among the Urums of Georgia, long before they left Turkey, the Orthodox Greeks were forced to make a choice between their language and faith. Being devout Christians, they chose to keep their Orthodox faith and thus relinquished their language. However, most historians consider this to be a myth.

Language 

The Urum language is a Turkic language belonging to the Kypchak branch of the Turkic language family, having been developed by Greeks who left Anatolia in the 19th century, many of whom had immigrated to K’vemo K’art’li in Georgia, or to Ukraine or Crimea. The Urum language displays substantial similarities with the Turkish dialects of Anatolia (e.g. in vocal harmony), but also with Russian (e.g. in the use of subordinate clauses). Urum has been written with the Greek alphabet, and between 1927 and 1937 it was written with Yañalif, and it was taught in some schools. After Yañalif's replacement by the Cyrillic script in 1940, the Urum language was to only be written in Cyrillic. Urum is considered by some to be a dialect of Crimean Tatar.

Much of Urum's religious vocabulary is descended from words of Turkish origin, for example, Allah for ‘God’ or cänäm for ‘hell’ (compare Turkish allah, cehennem). However, Russian loanwords are restricted to narrow Christian terms, e.g., gimn meaning ‘hymn’, derived from Russian gimn (Гимн) and episkop meaning ‘bishop’, derived from Russian episkop (Епископ).

See also 

Greeks in Georgia
Demographics of Ukraine
Demographics of Georgia (country)
Greeks in Russia and the Soviet Union

References 

Urum Greeks
Urum Greeks
Black Sea
Pontus (region)
Pontic Greeks
Greek minorities
Indigenous peoples of Ukraine
Peoples of the Caucasus
Turkic Christians